Wendy Price (born 1972) is a Welsh international lawn bowls player.

In 2008, she won a silver medal in the Women's fours competition at the 2008 World Outdoor Bowls Championship in Christchurch and was selected in the Welsh team for the 2010 Commonwealth Games.

In 2009 she won the triples and fours gold medals at the Atlantic Bowls Championships.

References 

1972 births
Welsh female bowls players
Welsh sportswomen
Living people
Bowls players at the 2010 Commonwealth Games
Commonwealth Games competitors for Wales